Kirill Tulupov (born April 23, 1988) is a Russian former professional ice hockey player who last played under contract with HPK of the Finnish Liiga.He ended his career in October 2016.

Playing career
Tulupov played in his native Russia before taking his game to Canada. He appeared in 172 games in the Quebec Major Junior Hockey League (QMJHL) with the Chicoutimi Saguenéens and Victoriaville Tigres between 2006 and 2009. He spent the 2009-10 season in Slovakia, turning out for HC Slovan Bratislava. In 2010-11, he had a brief stint at KHL side Spartak Moskva and also played in the VHL as well as in Kazakhstan.

In 2011, Tulupov returned to North America, joining the Oklahoma City Barons of the American Hockey League (AHL). He made 33 AHL appearances for the team, before splitting the 2012-13 season between the KHL (representing Avtomobilist Yekaterinburg and Amur Khabarovsk) and the CHL (playing for the Arizona Sundogs). In 2013-14, Tulupov made 33 ECHL appearances for the Gwinnett Gladiators and later signed with the Frederikshavn White Hawks of Denmark.

He continued his hockey journey at KHL’s Vityaz Podolsk, where he had a short stint during the 2014-15 campaign, before being snapped up by ECHL’s Wichita Thunder.

After he was traded by the ECHL Orlando Solar Bears, to the Rapid City Rush, Tulupov was later re-signed to a one-year contract for the following season on July 2, 2015. Tulupov appeared in the opening game of the 2015–16 season with the Rush, recording an assist, before he was released by the club on October 21, 2015.

In April 2016, he joined HPK of the Finnish top-flight Liiga.

Career statistics

International

References

External links

1988 births
Amur Khabarovsk players
Arizona Sundogs players
Avtomobilist Yekaterinburg players
Chicoutimi Saguenéens (QMJHL) players
Frederikshavn White Hawks players
Gwinnett Gladiators players
HC Slovan Bratislava players
HC Spartak Moscow players
HPK players
New Jersey Devils draft picks
Living people
Oklahoma City Barons players
Rapid City Rush players
Russian ice hockey defencemen
Ice hockey people from Moscow
Victoriaville Tigres players
HC Vityaz
Wichita Thunder players
Russian expatriate sportspeople in Canada
Russian expatriate sportspeople in Slovakia
Russian expatriate sportspeople in Finland
Russian expatriate sportspeople in the United States
Russian expatriate sportspeople in Denmark
Russian expatriate sportspeople in Kazakhstan
Expatriate ice hockey players in Canada
Expatriate ice hockey players in Slovakia
Expatriate ice hockey players in Finland
Expatriate ice hockey players in the United States
Expatriate ice hockey players in Denmark
Expatriate ice hockey players in Kazakhstan
Russian expatriate ice hockey people